Sumo Surprise is the debut studio album by the American punk band Ghoti Hook, released on Tooth and Nail Records.  The album is a pop punk CD, with a tendency toward both humor and evangelical Christianity.

Track listing 
 Body Juggler 3:00
 Seasons 2:56
 South Capitol Street 3:27
 Ooklah The Punk 2:46
 Tract Boy 3:27
 Scared Am I 3:37
 Samson  3:13
 Spice Drops 2:54 
 Shrinky Dinks 3:49 
 Money 3:26
 Super Sumo 3:01
 Knock Knock 3:06
 Dry Run  2:43
 Never 3:37

References

Ghoti Hook albums
1996 albums
Tooth & Nail Records albums